Roke Manor Research Limited is a British company based at Roke Manor near Romsey, Hampshire, which conducts research and development in the fields of communications, networks, electronic sensors, artificial intelligence, machine learning, data science, Military decision support consultancy and operational analysis, information assurance, and human science. In addition to supporting its parent Chemring, Roke undertakes contract research and development, and product development work for both public and private sector customers. Products developed from research at Roke Manor include the Hawk-Eye ball tracker, which is now used widely in sports such as tennis, football, and cricket.

Roke has been part of the Chemring Group since 2010, having been founded as part of the Plessey company to operate as a dedicated research and development centre, with mass production elsewhere, and later owned for almost 20 years by Siemens where it had a similar research role.

History
1956 – Founded as Plessey Research Roke Manor Limited by the Plessey company. The first managing director was Harold J. Finden, an electrical engineer at Plessey.
1990 – Passed to GEC-Siemens AG in a joint takeover.
1991 – Became wholly owned by Siemens AG when GEC sold their 50% shareholding to Siemens Plessey Electronic Systems.
2010 – Acquired by the Chemring Group PLC.
2021 – Roke made its first acquisition since the founding in 1956, acquiring Cubica Technology Ltd. and their holding company Cubica Group.

Sites 
The company's head office is at Roke Manor, Hampshire. It also has facilities in the Barnwood area of Gloucester and at MediaCityUK, Salford, Greater Manchester.

The Roke Manor site is based around a manor house which dates in part from 1653. The  grounds had a walled garden, stable block and cottages when bought by Plessey in 1956, and initially these were re-used for laboratory space and meeting rooms, but in various modernization programmes, all the original buildings except the Manor House have been demolished and much of the grounds covered by purpose-built facilities and car parking.

Technology timeline
1960 – Working prototype memory systems developed for the supercomputer, Atlas.
1975 – Designed and developed the world's first monolithic gallium arsenide microwave circuit.
1995 – Work began on the Hostile Artillery LOcation system (HALO), an acoustic locator of guns and mortars. HALO was developed to monitor ceasefire violations in the Yugoslav wars, and is in use with the British Army and other nations.
2000 – Won the 2000 Worldaware Innovation Award for work on land mine clearance.
2001 – Developed the Hawk-Eye vision-based ball tracking system.

Selected products
 RESOLVE – an electronic warfare manpack system for the intercept, geolocation and exploitation of tactical communications signals within the HF to SHF bands. In 2011 RESOLVE won a Queen's Award for Enterprise and Innovation. 
 Vigilance – a wide area multilateration system for tracking aircraft. Users include Eurocontrol, in support of RVSM.
 Miniature Radar Altimeters (MRA) – a range of MRA products primarily designed for use on airborne targets and unmanned aerial vehicles (UAVs).
 Epsilon – a software tool designed to predict the radar cross section (RCS) of a target directly from its geometrical description.
 IRIS – Automatic Number Plate Recognition (ANPR) equipment.
 LOCATE – a suite of products for spectrum monitoring, direction finding, adaptive beamforming and geolocation of HF signals.
 LOCATE-T – team-based mobile version of the LOCATE system.
 VIPER – electronic warfare planning and data triage.
 DAMARC – data science in policing.
 NELSON – driving Royal Navy digitisation.
 gekko – surface wave sensing.
 RESOLVE – bespoke lightweight dismounted close quarter Electronic Surveillance pack.
 HMEWC – High Mobility Electronic Warfare Capability (HMEWC) with integrated Command & Control, Electronic Surveillance and Electronic Attack, capable of operating in complex and contested RF environments.
 Media Miner.

References

External links

Technology companies of the United Kingdom
Companies based in Hampshire
Technology companies established in 1956
British companies established in 1956
Plessey